Gunilla Elisabeth Paijkull (born 5 September 1943) is a Swedish football coach and former player. She was head coach of the Sweden women's national football team at the 1991 FIFA Women's World Cup.

Paijkull, previously Gunilla Karlsson, was a football player with the Stockholm club AIK. In 1971 she was one of three AIK players called–up for an unofficial Sweden team's friendly match against Denmark in Copenhagen.

She began playing with Hammarby IF DFF in 1973 and was appointed head coach of the team in 1978.

Paijkull took over as Sweden women's national team coach in 1988, ahead of the 1988 FIFA Women's Invitation Tournament in which Sweden finished runners–up to Norway. She was the first woman to coach a national football team. At the inaugural 1991 FIFA Women's World Cup in China, Paijkull, the only female coach among the 12 finalists, guided Sweden to a third–place finish.

After leaving her position as national team coach Paijkull became a FIFA instructor. She served on FIFA's technical study group at the 1996 Atlanta Olympics, as well as at the 1995 and 1999 editions of the FIFA Women's World Cup.

Paijkull is of Estonian heritage. In 2013, she was serving on the board of Tyresö FF.

References

Bibliography

 

1943 births
Living people
Swedish women's footballers
1991 FIFA Women's World Cup managers
Swedish people of Estonian descent
Swedish women's football managers
Hammarby Fotboll (women) players
Damallsvenskan players
Women's association football midfielders
Sweden women's national football team managers
Female association football managers
People from Nyköping Municipality
Sportspeople from Södermanland County